modeFRONTIER is a multidisciplinary design optimization (MDO) platform developed by the Italian software house ESTECO SpA. Its workflow based environment, and multi-objective optimization algorithms are used for streamlining the engineering design process to cut time and cost while obtaining improved results.

History 
modeFRONTIER was developed as a spin-off of the European research project on "Design Optimization", called FRONTIER. The project started in 1996 thanks to the collaboration of the following partners: British Aerospace (UK), Parallab (Norway), University of Trieste, University of Newcastle (UK), Daimler-Benz Aerospace (DASA) (Germany), Defense Evaluation and Research Agency (UK), Electrolux-Zanussi (Italy) and Calortecnica (Italy). The project's main objective was to develop a technology for design optimization based on the cornerstone of "design analysis".

In 1999, following the end of the project, ESTECO was founded with the aim of further developing a commercial version of the FRONTIER software, which later became modeFRONTIER. In 2000, the commercial software, FRONTIER 2.0 was released (following FRONTIER 1.0, released in 1998). In 2002, the 2.5 version was released under the new name, modeFRONTIER, still in use today.

References
modeFRONTIER 2016 Adds User Profiles to Improve CAE Optimization Workflows

Computer system optimization software
Computer-aided design software
Computer-aided engineering software
Mathematical optimization software
Simulation software